The following list includes notable people who were born or have lived in Wilmette, Illinois. For a similar list organized alphabetically by last name, see the category page People from Wilmette, Illinois.

Academics and scientists

Acting and modeling

Architects

Business

Chefs

Music

Photography

Politics

Sports

Writing and journalism

Other

References

Wilmette
Wilmette